In Greek mythology, Marathonius or Marathonios may refer to two distinct characters:

 Marathonius, the 13th king of Sicyon who reigned for 30 years. His predecessor was Orthopolis and himself was succeeded by Marathus. During his reign, Cecrops Diphyes became the first king of Attica.

 Marathonios, the Locrian son of Deucalion and Pyrrha, the legendary progenitors of the Greek race. He was the brother of Orestheus and Pronous, father of Hellen.

Notes

Reference 

 Gantz, Timothy, Early Greek Myth: A Guide to Literary and Artistic Sources, Johns Hopkins University Press, 1996, Two volumes:  (Vol. 1),  (Vol. 2).

Mythological kings of Sicyon
Kings in Greek mythology
Deucalionids
Sicyonian characters in Greek mythology
Thessalian characters in Greek mythology